The 6th Light Anti-Aircraft Regiment, Royal New Zealand Artillery was a territorial air defence regiment of the New Zealand Army. It was formed in 1948 and equipped with 40mm Bofors anti-aircraft guns. The regiment was disbanded in 1961.

References

Artillery regiments of New Zealand
Military units and formations established in 1948
Military units and formations disestablished in 1961